Ilse Exl (November 26, 1907 — July 8, 1956) was an Austrian stage and film actress. She was the daughter of the actors Anna Exl and Ferdinand Exl.

Selected filmography
 Earth (1947)
 Ulli and Marei (1948)
 Veronika the Maid (1951)

References

Bibliography
 Fritsche, Maria. Homemade Men in Postwar Austrian Cinema: Nationhood, Genre and Masculinity. Berghahn Books, 2013.

External links

1907 births
1956 deaths
Actors from Innsbruck
People from the County of Tyrol
Austrian film actresses
Austrian stage actresses